= Mian Haji Sahib, Islamabad =

Mian Haji,Islamabad
- Town
- Mian Haji Sahib,
- Location within Pakistan
- Coordinates: 33.22°N 73.20°E
- Country: Pakistan
- Province: (Islamabad Capital Territory) Islamabad C.T
- Elevation: 479 m (1,572 ft)

Population
  - Total: 83,853
- Time zone: UTC+5 (PST)

Mian Haji Sahib is a town in the Islamabad Capital Territory of Pakistan. It is located at 33° 22' 50N 73° 20' 40E with an altitude of 479 metres (1574 feet).
